Christopher Rungkat and Elbert Sie were the defending champions, but Sie was not selected for the Indonesian team. Rungkat partnered Sunu Wahyu Trijati, but they lost in the quarterfinals to Francis Alcantara and Treat Huey.

Sanchai and Sonchat Ratiwatana won the gold medal, defeating Ruben Gonzales and Jeson Patrombon in the final, 6–4, 6–4.
Francis Alcantara and Treat Huey, and Warit Sorbutnark and Kittipong Wachiramanowong won the bronze medals.

Medalists

Seeds

Draw

References 
 Draw

Men's Doubles